Sluice Boxes State Park is a public recreation area in the Little Belt Mountains of Montana, United States, located  south of Belt on the Kings Hill Scenic Byway. The state park is highlighted by large cliffs and ledges where the northernmost eight miles of the Belt Creek canyon winds out of the Little Belt Mountains. Remains of the area's mining and railroading days are found throughout the canyon. The park offers fishing, hiking, floating, picnicking, and backcountry camping.

References

External links

Sluice Boxes State Park Montana Fish, Wildlife & Parks
Sluice Boxes State Park Trail Map Montana Fish, Wildlife & Parks

State parks of Montana
Protected areas of Cascade County, Montana
Protected areas established in 1974
1974 establishments in Montana